Group B of the 2019 Africa Cup of Nations qualification tournament was one of the twelve groups to decide the teams which qualified for the 2019 Africa Cup of Nations finals tournament. The group consisted of four teams: Cameroon, Morocco, Malawi, and Comoros (winners of the preliminary round).

The teams played against each other in home-and-away round-robin format between June 2017 and March 2019.

On 12 March 2017, the Football Association of Malawi announced their senior national football team would withdraw from the competition due to the lack of funding. However, they later announced its reversal of this decision and would continue to compete.

Morocco and Cameroon, the group winners and runners-up respectively, qualified for the 2019 Africa Cup of Nations.

Cameroon were the original hosts of the final tournament and would have been guaranteed of qualification regardless of their ranking; the matches of the team would have counted in determining the qualification of the other teams, and only the top team apart from Cameroon would have qualified for the final tournament. However, on 30 November 2018, Cameroon were stripped of hosting the 2019 Africa Cup of Nations. due to the Boko Haram insurgency and the Anglophone Crisis.

Standings

Matches

Goalscorers

Notes

References

External links
32nd Edition Of Total Africa Cup Of Nations, CAFonline.com

Group B